Dyschirius verticalis is a species of ground beetle in the subfamily Scaritinae. It was described by Jules Putzeys in 1878.

References

verticalis
Beetles described in 1878